Motosuke (written: 元助, 元輔, 元相 or 資祐) is a masculine Japanese given name. Notable people with the name include:

 (1559–1584), Japanese samurai
 (908–990), Japanese poet
 (1492–1592), Japanese samurai
 (1941–2007), Japanese animator, character designer and anime director

Japanese masculine given names